is a Japanese heavy metal band formed in Hirosaki in 1987. The band's current line-up consists of co-founders Shinji Wajima (guitar, vocals) and Ken-ichi Suzuki (bass, vocals) alongside Nobu Nakajima (drums, vocals), who joined in 2004. All three members contribute to the songwriting process. They have been noted for their stage personas, with Wajima dressing as a Meiji-era literary master, Suzuki dressing as a Buddhist monk, and Nakajima dressing as a Yakuza-style gangster.

History

Both natives of Hirosaki, Wajima and Suzuki first became acquainted while attending a concert at the local music venue. They eventually became close friends in 1981, when they both entered Hirosaki High School. Their friendship would further develop through frequent exchanges of music records. It was around this time that Suzuki first exposed Wajima to the music of his favorite bands Kiss, Saxon, and Judas Priest, while Wajima shared his love of the Beatles, King Crimson, Deep Purple, and Led Zeppelin. Suzuki was impressed by Wajima's talent for songwriting and wrote a song called "Demon", while Wajima wrote a song called "Apocalypse of Iron Grill", which was not received well by the local music venue but which Suzuki liked nonetheless. Two years later, Wajima and Suzuki joined the band Shine Shine Dan ("Dead Dead Group"), a band formed by members of the local music venue, with whom they played at music festivals.

In 1985, after enrolling at different universitiesWajima studied Buddhism at Komazawa University, while Suzuki studied Russian literature at Sophia Universitythey formed a hard rock band and settled on the name Ningen Isu in 1987 when drummer Noriyoshi Kamidate joined the band, taking the name from the 1924 short story of the same name by Edogawa Rampo. They first gained public attention in 1989 through a performance of their song "Injū" ("Beast in the Shadows") on Ikasu Band Tengoku (Cool Band Heaven), a new television music competition on Tokyo Broadcasting System Television. Their uniquely heavy sound, technical skill, and lyrics full of literary references took the judges by surprise.

In 1990, they released their first album Ningen Shikkaku, followed two years later by Ōgon no Yoake, after which Kamidate left the band. They kept their heavy sound and lyrics referencing literature. Drummer Masuhiro Goto would support the recording of their fourth album Rashōmon in 1993. In 1995 and 1996, Iwao Tsuchiya served as the band's drummer but was replaced by Goto as a permanent member until leaving in 2003. In 2004, current drummer Nobu Nakajima joined the band. Wajima, Suzuki, and Nakajima once lived in a neighborhood in the district Koenji, Tokyo, which is famous for its subculture, music and free atmosphere.

During the mid-2010s, Ningen Isu saw a significant increase in popularity. They previously spent years in relative obscurity outside of Japan, and the sales of their albums did not go well. The band played at the Ozzfest 2013, hosted by Ozzy Osbourne, which they as Black Sabbath fans felt honored by. In 2019, their record Shin Seinen reached rank 14 in the Oricon music charts, their highest chart position to date. They released the video for their song "Heartless Scat" on YouTube in May 2019, and it has since gained over 12 million views.

The band performed their first world tour in Berlin, Bochum, and London in February 2020.

Musical style
The band's lyrics often reference Japanese classical literature, including authors Edogawa Rampo, Dazai Osamu, Akutagawa Ryunosuke, Jun'ichirō Tanizaki, and Mishima Yukio, in addition to authors in other languages such as Edgar Allan Poe, H. P. Lovecraft, Friedrich Nietzsche, and Georges Bataille. They often address topics such as Hell, Buddhism, the universe, samurai culture, and gambling. Wajima and Suzuki have a local accent called the "Tsugaru dialect", which adds a unique and heavy atmosphere and rhythm to their songs. They, especially Wajima, often use difficult and old Japanese (words used in Edo period to Showa period, often hard to understand even for Japanese people). They often wear Kimono and traditional underwear Fundoshi on stage.

Influences
Ningen Isu was strongly influenced by Black Sabbath. Other influences include UFO, Led Zeppelin, Kiss, Budgie, King Crimson, and similar artists. The style of Wajima's guitar playing is influenced by Robert Fripp, Tony Iommi, Jimmy Page, Ace Frehley, Michael Schenker, and Tsugaru-jamisen. Suzuki is inspired mostly by Kiss and paints his face white while moving in a style similar to Kiss bassist Gene Simmons.

Members

Current
 Shinji Wajima / Wazzy (和嶋慎治; born 25 December 1965) – guitars, vocals, theremin, main lyrics, composer (1987–present). His costume has motifs of a literary master from the Meiji era. His main influences are the Beatles, blues, and enka. He often uses original effects he makes himself. He sometimes uses a theremin, which adds a cosmic mood. He loves Rakugo.
 Ken-ichi Suzuki / Suzuken (鈴木研一; born 11 March 1966) – bass, vocals, lyrics, composer (1987–present). Sporting a shaved head and a painted white face, he dresses like a Buddhist monk. He notably wears fundoshi, old-style Japanese underwear, beneath his kimono. In the band's early days, Suzuki often wore clothes inspired by Nezumi-otoko, a rat-man character from Ge-Ge-Ge no Kitaro.
 Nobu Nakajima / Nobu (ナカジマノブ; born 20 September 1966) – drums, vocals, lyrics, composer (2004–present). He wears a koikuchi shirt and sunglasses, taking his look from old-school Yakuza. He sometimes uses Dora, a kind of Japanese gong. His hard and energetic drumming style earned him the nickname "Aniki" ("big brother"). He is a big fan of Hideshi Hino and a collector of sneakers, dam cards, and comic books.

Former
 Noriyoshi Kamidate (上館徳芳; born 14 June 1962) – drums (1987–1992). He was influenced by Cozy Powell and used very restrained moves to match Suzuki's basslines.
 Masuhiro Goto (後藤マスヒロ; real name Masahiro Goto (後藤升宏); born 29 August 1965) – drums, vocals (1993–1995 as a supporting member; 1996–2003 as a full member). His drumming was more dynamic and nuanced, heavily contributing to Ningen Isu's sound during his tenure in the band. He played on five albums and even wrote and sang lead vocals on some.
 Iwao Tsuchiya (つちや いわお) – drums, vocals (1995–1996). He participated in two albums during his tenure, and even wrote and sang part of "Sanjussai" (三十歳) from the album Odoru Issunboushi (踊る一寸法師).

Timeline

Discography

Albums

Original albums

Best-of Albums

Live albums

Singles

Videos

References

External links
Official Page (Japanese)

Japanese hard rock musical groups
Japanese heavy metal musical groups
Japanese doom metal musical groups
Musical groups from Aomori Prefecture
Musical groups established in 1987
Japanese musical trios
Tokuma Japan Communications artists